The Magic of the Musicals was a UK concert series, produced by Flying Music, that regularly toured the UK in the 1990s and 2000s, initially starring Marti Webb and Mark Rattray with Mitch Sebastian, Paul Robinson, Lucie Florentine and Dawn Spence.

It was recorded for album release and television broadcast at the Bristol Hippodrome on 21 June 1992. The album, on CD and cassette, and VHS video was released on 28 September 1992.

The show first toured in spring 1991, but its popularity led to a further tour in early 1992 and another in the autumn of that year. It was subsequently repeated with different performers and songs, a number of times. Notably a 30 date tour of Canada and North America playing to sold out Arenas. The cast featured Marti Webb, Mark Rattray, Mitch Sebastian, Ian Mackenzie-Stewart, Alison Pollard and Linda Mae Brewer. 

Mitch Sebastian was the director / choreographer from 1994 - 1998 creating new formats each season to reflect the current hit shows. Webb performed regularly on all UK and European Tours alongside Robert Meadmore, Wayne Sleep and Dave Willetts. Melanie Stace and Kerry Ellis also replaced Webb for various tours.

By 1991, Webb was established as one of the principal musical theatre performers in the UK. Rattray had won the 1990 series of the television talent show Opportunity Knocks with his performance of "Empty Chairs at Empty Tables" from the musical Les Miserables.

Album

Track listing

Personnel 
 Producer - Pip Williams for Handle Artists
 Associate Producer - Tom Button
 Executive Producers - Paul Walden and Derek Nicol for The Flying Record Company
 Live Recording Engineer - John Wilson
 Post Production Engineer - Paul Golding
 Assistant Engineers - Mark Tucker and James Collins
 Original Stage Directors - Hugh Wooldridge and Richard Sampson
 Choreographer - Richard Sampson
 Replacement Director/Choreographer - Mitch Sebastian
 Marti Webb's Manager - Don Black
 Mark Rattray's Managers - Lindsey Brown and David Walker for Handle Artists
 Album Coordination - Paul Walden and Lindsey Downs
 Album Concept - Paul Walden and Derek Nicol
 Logo Design - Dewynters
 Liner Notes - John Martland

Musicians 
 Musical Director / Keyboards / Backing Vocals - Jae Alexander
 Keyboards - Dominic Barlow
 Electric and Acoustic Guitars - Graeme Taylor
 Bass Guitar - Steve Richardson
 Percussion - Keith Fairburn
 Trumpets / Flugels - Avelia Moisey and Lance Kelly
 Alto Sax / Flute / Clarinet - Nick Moss
 Tenor Sax / Clarinet / Bass Clarinet - Jenny Tilley
 Oboe / Cor Anglais - Deborah Boyes
 Trombone / Bass trombone - Steve Wilkes
 Drums - Sebastian Guard

References

Concert tours of the United Kingdom
1992 live albums
Live albums by British artists